Longlegs is an upcoming American horror thriller film written and directed by Oz Perkins.  It stars Nicolas Cage, Maika Monroe, Alicia Witt and Blair Underwood.

Premise
Lee Harker, a talented new FBI agent, has been assigned to an unsolved case of a serial killer. As the investigation becomes more complicated and occult evidence is uncovered, Harker realizes a personal link to the ruthless killer and must act quickly to prevent another family murder.

Cast
 Nicolas Cage
 Maika Monroe as Lee Harker
 Alicia Witt 
 Blair Underwood

Production
In November 2022, it was reported that Oz Perkins would direct the film from a screenplay he wrote. Nicolas Cage signed on to co-produce and star in the horror thriller film, where he plays an "elusive serial killer". In February 2023, Maika Monroe was added to the cast as FBI agent, Lee Harker. The following month, Alicia Witt and Blair Underwood joined in undisclosed roles.

Principal photography commenced in Vancouver, British Columbia on January 16, 2023 and wrapped in late February 2023.

Release
In February 2023,  at the European Film Market the independent distributor Neon were in talks to acquire the North American rights.

References

External links
 

Upcoming films
Upcoming English-language films
Films directed by Oz Perkins
Saturn Films films
2020s English-language films
2020s horror thriller films
Films shot in Vancouver